Masasi Airport  is an airport serving the town of Masasi in the Mtwara Region of Tanzania.

See also

 List of airports in Tanzania
 Transport in Tanzania

References

External links
Tanzania Airports Authority
OurAirports - Masasi
OpenStreetMap - Masasi

Airports in Tanzania
Buildings and structures in the Mtwara Region